DDE may refer to:

 D.D.E. (band), a Norwegian rock band
 Delay differential equation, a type of differential equation
 Deep-dose equivalent, a measure of radiation absorbed by the body
 Dichlorodiphenyldichloroethylene, a chemical that results from the breakdown of DDT
 Doctrine of double effect, a set of ethical criteria to evaluate the permissibility of acting when one's otherwise legitimate act may also cause an effect one would normally be obliged to avoid
 Dwight D. Eisenhower, the 34th president of the United States
 Dynamic Data Exchange, a Microsoft Windows and OS/2 inter-application data communication protocol
 Escort destroyer, a US Navy classification used between 1945 and 1962
 D.De., an abbreviation used for the United States District Court for the District of Delaware
 Deepin Desktop Environment, a Desktop Environment used by several Linux Distributions